The casting tournaments  at the 2001 World Games in Akita was played between 22 and 24 August. 48 athletes, from 12 nations, participated in the tournament. The casting competition took place in Akita Prefectural Central Park.

Participating nations

Medal table

Events

Men

Women

References

External links
 International Casting Sport Federation
 Casting on IWGA website
 Results

 
2001 World Games
2001